"Cannonball" is a song by American alternative rock band the Breeders from their second studio album, Last Splash (1993). The song demo was originally called "Grunggae" as it merged "island riffs and grunge". This demo was later included in the 20th anniversary re-release of the album LSXX.

Recording
The rhythm of the introduction is constructed from metallic clicking on a snare rim and cymbal stand, which is tapped out by drummer Jim McPherson. The loud, distorted voice of Kim Deal at the beginning of the song was achieved by singing closely into a harmonica microphone, which can also be seen in most live performances.

Composition
"Cannonball" is an alternative rock, pop rock, indie pop and grunge song that lasts for a duration of three minute and thirty-six seconds, featuring a balance of quirky pop hooks and surging power which support playful, goofball lyrics. According to the sheet music published at Musicnotes.com by EMI Music Publishing, the song is written in the time signature of common time, with a moderately fast rock tempo of 112 beats per minute and composed in the key of E-flat major (E), while Kim Deal's vocal range spans from a low of E3 to a high of B4. The song has a basic sequence that alternates between the chords of B5 and E5 during the introduction and verses and follows B5–E5–A5 at the chorus as its chord progression.

The song opens with the distorted voice of singer-songwriter Kim Deal testing a microphone by intoning "Check, check, one, two" against hissing feedback and over similar distorted vocal harmonizing. The track's drum rhythm and trademark bubbling bass line signal the start of the song. A slithering guitar lick skips the above its rhythm section before being overtaken by the high, squealing feedback of crunching guitar. It is nearly a full minute into the song before the introduction of its vocal melody, with Deal slyly cooing humorous lyrics. The band pulls to a brief halt for Deal to proclaim the parent album's title: "I'm the last splash".

During the verses, Kim Deal recites repetitive lines with a seductive shyness. They unleash layers of guitar distortion alongside Deal's distorted, transmitted vocals shouting: "Hey now, hey now/I want you Koo Koo, Cannonball". Its musical arrangement features stuttering, start-and-stop transitions before evening out into an infectious, melodic hook layered with sweet vocal harmonies, with Deal and the band repeating the line: "In the shade/In the shade." "Cannonball" employs a false ending, pausing for a whole measure and then crashing into its chorus and shifting in another full verse and chorus before coming to an abrupt halt.

Reception
As the lead single from their second album, "Cannonball" went on to become the Breeders' biggest commercial success. NME, Melody Maker and The Village Voices Pazz & Jop annual year-end critics' poll all named it best single of 1993, which helped propel the album Last Splash as well as their follow-up single "Divine Hammer" to Platinum status. AllMusic's Tom Maginnis complimented the single, writing, "the song conveys an effusive energy, balancing quirky hooks with a gushing power, supporting playful, goofball lyrics that perfectly deliver the song's sense of unhinged, freewheeling fun".

It ranked  on VH1's "100 Greatest Songs of the 90s".

Music video
The music video for "Cannonball" was directed by Kim Gordon and Spike Jonze. It features the band in a garage, and the Deal sisters in what seems to be a dressing room trashed with clothes, sitting in a chair together. There are also shots of a cannonball rolling down suburban streets, as well as a shot of Kim Deal singing underwater.

Track listings
CD single
 "Cannonball" – 3:33
 "Cro-Aloha" – 2:15

CD and 12-inch maxi
 "Cannonball" – 3:33
 "Cro-Aloha" – 2:15
 "Lord of the Thighs" (Steven Tyler) – 3:58
 "900" (Wiggs) – 4:27

Cassette
 "Cannonball" – 3:33
 "Lord of the Thighs" – 3:58
 "Cro-Aloha" – 2:15

"Cro-Aloha" is a demo version of "No Aloha" from Last Splash.

Personnel
 Guitars and lead vocals: Kelley Deal and Kim Deal
 Bass and vocals: Josephine Wiggs
 Drums: Jim MacPherson
 Artwork by Paul McMenamin
 Design by Vaughan Oliver
 Photography by Jason Love
 Recorded at Coast Recorders, San Francisco; Cro-Magnon, Dayton; Refhaze, Dayton

Charts

Weekly charts

Year-end charts

Certifications and sales

Release history

Usage in media
"Cannonball" was featured in a preview for South Park: Bigger, Longer and Uncut, the film Moonlight and Valentino, the start of A Walk to Remember as well as in the heist scene of Sugar & Spice. It was the original televised score to a skit on MTV's sketch comedy show The State, but due to music licensing issues had to be re-recorded with a sound-alike song for the DVD. The song was also featured in the third season in episode 3 in Misfits and in the season six finale of True Blood. The band Phish covered the song during their May 7, 1994, concert in Dallas, Texas, which was later released commercially as Live Phish Volume 18. In 2000, Nissan used the song in a commercial for the Sentra. Courtney Barnett performed the song on The A.V. Club in 2014 for their Undercover live music web series and during her 2015 US tour. On The A.V. Club performance, Barnett stated "I chose it 'cause I love that album, and when we went to make [Sometimes I Sit and Think, and Sometimes I Just Sit] recently, I put that song on for the first day of recording - just to psych me up".

References

External links
 

4AD singles
1993 debut singles
1993 songs
The Breeders songs
CSS (band) songs
Music videos directed by Spike Jonze
Songs written by Kim Deal